Major League Baseball (MLB) and Nippon Professional Baseball (NPB) are the highest levels of baseball in the United States and Japan, respectively. MLB started in 1876, while NPB was not formed until 1950, following reorganization of the Japanese Baseball League, which had been in existence since 1936. Though ostensibly the same game, baseball, is played in both MLB and NPB there are a number of differences between the game in the two organizations.

Differences

Game rules 
The NPB rules are essentially those of the American Major League Baseball (MLB), but technical elements are slightly different.

Ball 
MLB uses a standardized ball manufactured by Rawlings. Its seams are rather flat, and it is prepared for use by rubbing it with a special mud to reduce the slipperiness of the new leather. For a long period there was no standard ball in NPB, but currently a standard ball manufactured by Mizuno is used across all teams in the league. The NPB ball is slightly smaller than its MLB equivalent and has better grip, making it easier to manipulate and spin.

Field 
The Nippon league uses a smaller strike zone, and playing field. The strike zone is narrower "inside" than away from the batter. Five Nippon league teams have fields whose small dimensions would violate the American Official Baseball Rules.

Ties 
Unlike North American baseball, Japanese baseball games may end in a tie. If the score is tied after nine innings of play, up to three additional innings will be played; this includes the playoffs, but not the Japan Series going beyond Game 7. If there is no winner after 12 innings, the game is declared a tie; these games count as neither a win nor a loss to team standings or to postseason series.

Competition rules 
MLB teams play 162 games in the regular series, while NPB teams each play 143.

The end-of-season championship in MLB is the World Series, a best-of-seven competition in which a team must win four games to clinch the title. NPB's championship is the Japan Series, also a best-of-seven competition. However, since games can end in a tie, it may take more than seven games to decide the series. If the series must be extended, all games beyond Game 7 are played with no innings limit, with Game 8 being played in the same venue as Game 7, and Game 9 and beyond played in the opposing team's venue following a moving day. A Game 8 has only happened once in Japan Series history, in the 1986 Japan Series between the Hiroshima Toyo Carp and Seibu Lions.

Rosters
MLB teams have 26-man active rosters, drawn from a larger 40-man roster of players under contract with the club. Players on the 40-man roster who are not on the active roster are typically either players currently on the injured list (or other temporary inactive list) or are assigned to the team's Triple-A minor league affiliate. 

Although each NPB team roster has 28 players there is a 25 player limit for each game. Managers scratch three players before each game, typically including the most recent starting pitcher, similar to professional basketball.

Most NPB teams have a six-man starting pitcher rotation while MLB teams feature five-man rotations.

Gameplay 
American MLB players, scouts, and sabermetricians describe play in the NPB as "AAAA"; less competitive than in MLB, but more competitive than in Triple A. 

In addition, Japanese teams practice much more often than American teams; the game relies more on off-speed pitching and not as many fastballs, and team harmony is stressed over individual achievements. As American writer Robert Whiting wrote in his 1977 book The Chrysanthemum and the Bat, "the Japanese view of life, stressing group identity, cooperation, hard work, respect for age, seniority and 'face' has permeated almost every aspect of the sport.... Baseball Samurai Style is different."

Baseball in the United States has been described as offensive while in Japan it is defensive.

References 

 
Professional sports leagues in Japan
Major League Baseball
Professional sports leagues in the United States